Daydar or Dayedar or Daidar may refer to:
 Daydar-e Olya
 Daydar-e Sofla